A venous heart is the type of heart in which only blood with CO₂ circulates. Venous hearts receive blood from veins and pumps it for oxygenation. This type of heart is generally found in fishes.

Structure
Venous hearts only have the right side of heart, which contains an atrium (also known as auricle) and an ventricle. The heart is made of two chambers, unlike human hearts which have four chambers.

Blood circulation
The blood circulation system via venous heart is close-looped. A venous heart is single circuit and the heart pumps blood all over the body with only a single loop. Deoxygenated blood circulates to the atrium from the body, and afterwards the deoxygenated blood moves to the ventricles from the atrium. Next, the blood reaches the gills for purification.

Like all hearts, venous hearts are also engaged in the distribution of nutrients, oxygen, hormones and other necessities to all parts of the body, and remove metabolic waste.

References

Fish anatomy